The Caragiale National University of Theatre and Film, Bucharest is a public university in Bucharest, Romania, founded in 1954. It is named in honour of playwright Ion Luca Caragiale.

History

First theatre school
The first theatre faculty in Bucharest began its activity in 1834 within the Philharmonic School.

IATC and precursors (1948-1990)
A Faculty of Stage Direction opened in 1948 within the Romanian Art Institute, at that time the center of all Romanian higher education in the arts.

The year 1950 saw the founding of both the Institute for Film and the Institute for Theatre I. L. Caragiale (named after the classic Romanian playwright). In 1954, the two institutions merged into the I.L. Caragiale Institute of Theatre and Film Arts (IATC).

After 1990
The institute functioned under this name until 1990, when it became the Academy of Theatre and Film – the only such school in Romania with a ranking equal to that of a university and with international recognition.

Since 1990, the Academy of Theatre and Film has undergone a continuous reform process. New specializations have been added, such as audiovisual communication and multimedia sound editing (at the Film Faculty), puppets, marionettes, choreography and scenography (at the Theatre Faculty). The number of students has gone up, while the curricula and study programs have been continuously improved and diversified.

In 1998, the Academy of Theatre and Film became the University of Theatre and Film I.L. Caragiale. In 2001, it became the National University of Theatre and Film I.L. Caragiale.

Notable alumni

(This list includes alumni from both the Film and the Acting schools.)

 Elena Albu, actress
 Mircea Albulescu, actor
 George Alexandru, actor
 Violeta Andrei, actress
 Chris Avram, actor
 Leopoldina Bălănuță, actress
 Paul Barbă Neagră, film director
 Marga Barbu, actress
 Alina Bârgăoanu, university professor
 Zaharia Bârsan, playwright, poet, and actor
 Andreea Bibiri, actress and theatre director
 Andrei Blaier, film director
 Claudiu Bleonț, actor
 Elisabeta Bostan, film director
 Olga Bucătaru, actress
 Dragoș Bucur, actor
 Rozina Cambos, actress
 Nae Caranfil, film director
 Adi Carauleanu, actor
 Dan Condurache, actor
 Ioana Crăciunescu, actress
 Alexandru Dabija, actor
 Theodor Danetti, actor
 Gheorghe Dănilă, actor
 Alexandru Darie, theater director
 Iurie Darie, actor
 Mircea Diaconu, actor and politician
 Ion Dichiseanu, actor
 Puși Dinulescu, playwright and director
 Dana Dogaru, actress
 Catrinel Dumitrescu, actress
 Toma Enache, film director
 David Esrig, theatre director
 Ioan Fiscuteanu, actor
 Valeria Gagealov, actress
 Tudor Gheorghe, musician
 Luminița Gheorghiu, actress
 Tudor Giurgiu, film director
 Manuela Hărăbor, actress
 Hanno Höfer, film director
 Indiggo, the twin sisters Gabriela and Mihaela Modorcea, singer-songwriters and reality television personalities
 Marcel Iureș, actor (Pirates of the Caribbean: At World's End)
 Radu Jude, film director (Aferim!)
 Maia Morgenstern, actress (The Passion of the Christ)
 Cristian Mungiu, filmmaker (4 Months, 3 Weeks and 2 Days)
 Mircea Mureșan, film director
 Cristian Nemescu, film director
 Barna Nemethi, film director and photographer
 Călin Peter Netzer, film director
 Sebastian Papaiani, actor
 Dorotheea Petre, actress
 Irina Petrescu, actress
 Florin Piersic, actor
 , actor, writer and director (Youth Without Youth)
 Adrian Pintea, actor
 Adina Pintilie, film director
 George Piștereanu, actor
 Tania Popa, actress
 Stela Popescu, actress
 Corneliu Porumboiu, film director
 Victor Rebengiuc, actor
 Marcel Roșca, Olympic pistol shooter
 Alec Secăreanu, actor (God's Own Country)
 Saviana Stănescu, playwright
 Eusebiu Ștefănescu, actor
 Cosmina Stratan, journalist and film actress
 Valentin Teodosiu, actor
 Ana Ularu, actress
 Bogdan Ulmu, theatre director and writer
 Melania Ursu, actress
 Tora Vasilescu, actress
 Andi Vasluianu, actor
 Dorel Vișan, actor
 Florin Zamfirescu, actor

References

External links
 

UNATC
Educational institutions established in 1954
Mass media in Bucharest
1954 establishments in Romania
Drama schools in Romania